"Pick It Up" is a song by American rapper Famous Dex featuring fellow American rapper ASAP Rocky. The song was produced by FKi 1st and Sosa808, and heavily samples Cissy Houston's "Nothing Can Stop Me". It was originally released on Famous Dex's SoundCloud account on October 18, 2017, before being released to streaming services on October 20, 2017. The song peaked at number 54 on the Billboard Hot 100 and has been certified platinum by the RIAA.

Music video
A music video for the song was released on January 7, 2018, directed by AWGE and Hidji Films.

Charts

Weekly charts

Year-end charts

Certifications

References

External links
 

2017 singles
2017 songs
Songs written by ASAP Rocky
Songs written by FKi 1st

300 Entertainment singles